Joseph Owen Thomas (born 28 October 1983) is an English actor and comedian. He is best known for playing Simon Cooper in the award-winning E4 sitcom The Inbetweeners (2008–2010) and its two film adaptions, The Inbetweeners Movie (2011) and The Inbetweeners 2 (2014), both achieving box office success.

After The Inbetweeners concluded, Thomas remained connected to Channel 4, joining the cast of comedy-drama series Fresh Meat in 2011, portraying the role of Kingsley Owen until 2016. He was reunited with his The Inbetweeners colleague James Buckley when they both joined the cast of BBC Two sitcom White Gold, with Thomas portraying the role of Martin Lavender. In 2018, he starred in the comedy film The Festival.

Early life and education
Born in Chelmsford, Essex, as the first of four boys, Thomas attended King Edward VI Grammar School, Chelmsford before reading History at Pembroke College, Cambridge. At Cambridge, Thomas was a member of the Footlights, alongside his future Inbetweeners co-star Simon Bird. Bird and Thomas served as the President and the Secretary of the Footlights, respectively, in 2005–2006. Of his education, he states, "I never really recovered from the fact that the lecturers weren't paid to be nice to me. Or that the carrot-and-stick thing that happened at school no longer occurred. If you do quite well, nobody's that bothered; and if you really fuck up, nobody's that bothered. It has to be from you and I was easily distracted". Nevertheless, Thomas graduated with a 2:1 degree in History in 2006.

After graduation, Thomas briefly shared a flat with Bird and fellow Pembroke graduate and Footlights alumnus Jonny Sweet.

Career
After entering the performing arts via the Footlights, Thomas performed with fellow University of Cambridge students at the Edinburgh Festival Fringe in a production of All's Well That Ends Well directed by author Duncan Barrett. After graduating from university, Thomas took to acting professionally, and his parents have accepted and are not ashamed of his choice of career.

Thomas is in a double act along with Sweet, and they have performed their show, The Jonny and Joe Show, at the Edinburgh Fringe Festival.

Thomas' big break in television was his role as Simon Cooper in The Inbetweeners which was so popular that it spawned two feature films, The Inbetweeners Movie and The Inbetweeners 2. Together with Bird and writing partner Sweet, he wrote Chickens, a satirical sketch about three conscientious objectors during World War I. It was broadcast as part of Channel 4's Comedy Showcase in 2011. In 2012, it was picked up by Sky One who commissioned a full, six episode series; filming began in late 2012 and debuted in August 2013.

Following this, Thomas starred in the student sitcom Fresh Meat as Kingsley Owen and played a Maths teacher in the first episode of the second series of Threesome. In 2017, Thomas began starring in the sitcom White Gold, along with his other The Inbetweeners co-star James Buckley.

In 2018 Thomas began work on Proposal, a comedy radio series announced as part of BBC Radio 2's spring "funny fortnight", in which he plays Jamie, a man preparing to propose to his girlfriend Lucy (Pearl Mackie).

Personal life 
As of 2017, Thomas resides on the Barbican Estate, London, with his fiancée Hannah Tointon. In October 2022 they announced the birth of their first child, a girl. He is a supporter of Tottenham Hotspur and has diagnosed himself with autism spectrum disorder.

Filmography

Film

Television

References

External links
 

Living people
21st-century English male actors
Alumni of Pembroke College, Cambridge
English male film actors
English male television actors
Male actors from Essex
People educated at King Edward VI Grammar School, Chelmsford
Actors from Chelmsford
1983 births